108 (one hundred [and] eight) is the natural number following 107 and preceding 109.

In mathematics 
108 is:

an abundant number.
a semiperfect number.
a tetranacci number.
the hyperfactorial of 3 since it is of the form .
divisible by the value of its φ function, which is 36.
divisible by the total number of its divisors (12), hence it is a refactorable number.
the angle in degrees of the interior angles of a regular pentagon in Euclidean space.
palindromic in bases 11 (9911), 17 (6617), 26 (4426), 35 (3335) and 53 (2253)
a Harshad number in bases 2, 3, 4, 6, 7, 9, 10, 11, 12, 13 and 16
a self number.
an Achilles number because it is a powerful number but not a perfect power.
nine dozen

There are 108 free polyominoes of order 7.

The equation   results in the golden ratio.

Religion and the arts 

The number 108 is considered sacred by the Dharmic Religions, such as Hinduism, Buddhism, and Jainism.

Hinduism 
In Hindu tradition, the Mukhya Shivaganas (attendants of Shiva) are 108 in number and hence Shaiva religions, particularly Lingayats, use malas of 108 beads for prayer and meditation.

Similarly, in Gaudiya Vaishnavism, Lord Krishna in Brindavan had 108 followers known as gopis. Recital of their names, often accompanied by the counting of a 108-beaded mala, is often done during religious ceremonies.

The Sri Vaishnavite Tradition has 108 Divya Desams (temples of Vishnu) that are revered by the 12 Alvars in the Divya Prabandha, a collection of 4,000 Tamil verses. There are also 18 pithas (sacred places).

The Sudarshana Chakra is a spinning, discus weapon with 108 serrated edges, generally portrayed on the right rear hand of the four hands of Vishnu.

Jainism 

In Jainism, the total number of ways of Karma influx (Aasrav). 4 Kashays (anger, pride, conceit, greed) x 3 karanas (mind, speech, bodily action) x 3 stages of planning (planning, procurement, commencement) x 3 ways of execution (own action, getting it done, supporting or approval of action).

Buddhism 
In Buddhism, according to Bhante Gunaratana this number is reached by multiplying the senses smell, touch, taste, hearing, sight, and consciousness by whether they are painful, pleasant or neutral, and then again by whether these are internally generated or externally occurring, and yet again by past, present and future, finally we get 108 feelings. 6 × 3 × 2 × 3 = 108.

Tibetan Buddhist malas or rosaries (Tib. ཕྲེང་བ Wyl. phreng ba, "Trengwa") are usually 108 beads; sometimes 111 including the guru bead(s), reflecting the words of the Buddha called in Tibetan the Kangyur (Wylie: Bka'-'gyur) in 108 volumes.
Zen priests wear juzu (a ring of prayer beads) around their wrists, which consists of 108 beads.

The Lankavatara Sutra has a section where the Bodhisattva Mahamati asks Buddha 108 questions and another section where Buddha lists 108 statements of negation in the form of "A statement concerning X is not a statement concerning X." In a footnote, D.T. Suzuki explains that the Sanskrit word translated as "statement" is pada which can also mean "foot-step" or "a position." This confusion over the word "pada" explains why some have mistakenly held that the reference to 108 statements in the Lankavatara refer to the 108 steps that many temples have.

In Japan, at the end of the year, a bell is chimed 108 times in Buddhist temples to finish the old year and welcome the new one. Each ring represents one of 108 earthly temptations (Bonnō) a person must overcome to achieve nirvana.

Other references 

In the neo-Gnostic teachings of Samael Aun Weor, an individual has 108 chances (lifetimes) to eliminate his egos and transcend the material world before "devolving" and having the egos forcefully removed in the infradimensions.

Martial arts 

Many East Asian martial arts trace their roots back to Buddhism, specifically, to the Buddhist Shaolin Temple. Because of their ties to Buddhism, 108 has become an important symbolic number in a number of martial arts styles.

According to Marma Adi and Ayurveda, there are 108 pressure points in the body, where consciousness and flesh intersect to give life to the living being.
The Chinese school of martial arts agrees with the South Indian school of martial arts on the principle of 108 pressure points.
108 number figures prominently in the symbolism associated with karate, particularly the Gōjū-ryū discipline. The ultimate Gōjū-ryū kata, Suparinpei, literally translates to 108. Suparinpei is the Chinese Foochow language pronunciation of the number 108, while gojūshi of Gojūshiho is the Japanese pronunciation of the number 54. The other Gōjū-ryū kata, Sanseru (meaning "36") and Seipai ("18") are factors of the number 108.
The 108 moves of the Yang Taijiquan long form and 108 moves in the Wing Chun wooden dummy form, taught by Ip Man, are noted in this regard.
The Eagle Claw Kung Fu style has a form known as the 108 Locking Hand Techniques. This form is considered the essence of the style, consisting of an encyclopedia of Chin Na techniques, and is said to be passed down from the founder General Yue Fei.
Paek Pal Ki Hyung, the 7th form taught in the art of Kuk Sool Won, translates literally to "108 technique" form. It is also frequently referred to as the "eliminate 108 torments" form. Each motion corresponds with one of the 108 Buddhist torments or defilements.
In the Cambodian martial art of Bokator, there are 108 kbach in gates 1 through 8 of the hand-to-hand combat techniques.
There 108 defense combinations that are considered canon in Shaolin Kempo Karate.

In literature

 In Homer's Odyssey, the number of suitors coveting Penelope, wife of Odysseus.
 There are 108 outlaws in the Chinese classic Water Margin/Outlaws of the Marsh by Shi Nai'an.
 There are 108 love sonnets in Astrophil and Stella, the first English sonnet sequence by Sir Philip Sidney.
 There are 108 lines in Edgar Allan Poe's 1845 poem "The Raven".
 108 alien colonists (called Salaxalans) die when their landing craft accidentally explodes on the primordial Earth in Douglas Adam's 1987 novel Dirk Gently's Holistic Detective Agency.
 There are 108 murders detailed in "The Part About The Crimes" in Roberto Bolaño's 2004 novel 2666.

In science 
 108 is the atomic number of hassium.
 108 degrees Fahrenheit is the internal temperature at which the human body's vital organs begin to fail from overheating.
 The distance of Earth from the Sun is about 108 times the diameter of the Sun (actually closer to 107.51, as per definition of the AU). Actual ratio varies between 105.7 (Perihelion) and 109.3 (Aphelion).
 The distance between the Earth and the Moon is also about 108 times the diameter of the Moon. The coincidence that the Sun and Moon both have approximately the same ratio between their diameters and their distances to Earth means their apparent sizes in Earth's sky are about the same, which is what makes total solar eclipses possible.

In technology 
 The number of Mbit/s of a non-standard extension of IEEE 802.11g wireless network using channel bonding.

In sports 
 108 is the number that the Belgian cyclist Wouter Weylandt wore when he crashed fatally in the Giro d'Italia on May 9, 2011. As a tribute, many supporters held replicas of his race number by the side of the road the next day. The organization of the Giro d'Italia decided not to issue race number 108 in future editions, to commemorate him.
 An official Major League Baseball baseball has 108 stitches.
 In 2016 the Chicago Cubs (MLB) won the World Series for the first time in 108 years, ending the longest championship drought in North American professional sports.  The Cubs' win came in the 10th inning with 8 runs (108).

In card games 
 There are 108 cards in a deck of UNO cards.
 The traditional card game Canasta is played with 108 cards.

In other fields 
 In India, 108 (1-0-8) is the toll-free emergency telephone number.

See also 
 108 (band)
 List of highways numbered 108

Notes

References 
 Wells, D. The Penguin Dictionary of Curious and Interesting Numbers London: Penguin Group. (1987): 134

External links 

 The Significance of the number 108
 Meaning of 108 beads on a mala
 Article on the symbolism of the number 108
 Our Sun, Planet Earth and the Hoary 108
 The Mystical 108 in the Bible, Eastern Religions and the TV Show LOST
 The spiritual meaning of 108

Integers